Rinxent is a commune in the Pas-de-Calais department in the Hauts-de-France region of France.

Geography

Population
The inhabitants are called Rinxentois.

Places of interest
 Two churches, both dating from the nineteenth century.
 A nineteenth century Château.
 Traces of an old castle.
 A museum devoted to marble, quarried in the commune.

See also
Communes of the Pas-de-Calais department

References

External links

  Official town website
  History of Rinxent

Communes of Pas-de-Calais